Several cities in China had tram systems during the 20th century; however, by the end of the century, only Dalian and Changchun remained extant. However the 21st century has seen a resurgence in tram transport systems as China attempts to combat with urban traffic congestion and pollution.

List of historical tram systems
 Beijing had the first tram system in China. It opened in 1899 and connected Majiapu Railway Station to the south gate of the city. Trams were phased out 1958 to 1959.
 Fushun, Liaoning had a tram system circa 1902, operated by the Manchurian Railway Company with 26 trams.
 Tianjin city, had a tram system that opened in 1906. By 1933 it had 9 miles of track and operated 116 tramcars. It was closed by 1972.
 The Changchun tramway system started operations in 1942. By the 1950s the system covered  with 98 cars. The system continues to operate today.
 In Shanghai there were three tram systems - two operated by the colonial powers of Britain and France and one by a Chinese company. The British system opened in 1908 and was the largest of the three. It had 7 lines and ran 216 tramcars. The British system merged with Chinese system in 1952. The French system opened the same year and its 3 lines ran 60 tramcars. Like the British it merged into the Chinese system in 1953. The last tram services ended in 1975.
 In Shenyang, Liaoning, a Japanese owned electric tramway opened in 1925 and replaced an earlier horse-drawn tram system that dated from around 1907. By 1937 it had expanded to cover  of track and ran 21 tramcars. It was finally closed in 1973.

 Harbin, Heilongjiang had a system from 1927 with 8 lines and about 40 trams. The system closed in 1987.
 The city of Anshan, Liaoning, had a single tram line from 1956 till the late 1990s and the track was dug up in 2006.
 Dalian, Liaoning opened its first tram line on September 25, 1909. It was operated by South Manchuria Railway. By 1945, the system had 11 lines. Today 2 lines remain in operation covering . The system is in the process up being updated with a mixture of old tram cars and new modern low floor cars in operation.

New tram systems

Tianjin and Shanghai have recently introduced rubber tired trams for their TEDA Modern Guided Rail Tram and Zhangjiang Tram respectively.

In 2011, Shenyang city decided to construct a new tram network to complement its new metro network. The first three lines of the new system were opened on August 15, 2013. A year later, Nanjing opened the new Hexi trams just before the 2014 Youth Olympics. Since them new tram systems opened in a number of cities in China such as Qingdao, Guangzhou, Shenzhen, Suzhou, Zhuhai, Wuhan, Huai'an and Beijing.

Light rail/Tram systems
Legend
 - In operation.
 - Under test run.
 - Out of service

Under construction
 Baoshan
Baoshan Tram T1
Dujiangyan
 Dujiangyan Tram
 Delingha
 Delingha Modern Tram
 Guangzhou
 Huangpu Tram Line 2, Line 5
 Guiyang
 Line T2
 Jiaxing
 Tram T2
 Lijiang
 Lijiang Tram Line 1
 Turpan
Turpan Tram
 Xi'an
Xi'an High-tech Zone Tram (西安高新区有轨电车)
 Zhangye
Zhangye Danxia Tram

Suspended

Lanzhou New Area planned a 5-line modern tram network but construction was halted in 2017 due to newly imposed restraints on borrowing.

Planned
 Nanjing
 Nanjing Jiangxinzhou Tram (南京江心洲有轨电车)
Tianjin (Xiqing Tram T2)
Zhuzhou Tram

Lhasa, Haikou, Quanzhou, Zhengzhou, Kunshan, Baotou, Korla, Anshun, Hangzhou, Changzhou, Taizhou and Huangshan are planning tram networks for the future.

See also 
Autonomous Rail Rapid Transit in China
Urban rail transit in China
Rail transport in China
Passenger rail transport in China
Hong Kong Tramways

Notes

References